The Governor of Chester was a military officer responsible for the garrison at Chester Castle. The equivalent or related role from the 11th to 14th centuries was Constable of Chester.

Governors

 1399: John Montagu, 3rd Earl of Salisbury
 1643: (11 November–) John Byron, 1st Baron Byron
 1644 (19 May–): William Legge
 1644: John Marrow (shot by Parliamentary forces)
 1644: Sir Nicholas Byron (captured during siege)
 1644: John Byron, 1st Baron Byron
 1646–?: Michael Jones (Parliamentarian)
 1647- Col. William Massey of Audlem arrested by mutineers 30 June 1647- (Dore)
 1650: Robert Dukenfield
 1650s: Thomas Croxton
 1659: Richard Dutton
 ?–1660: Robert Venables
 1660–1663: Sir Evan Lloyd, 1st Baronet
 1663–1682: Sir Geoffrey Shakerley
 1682–1689: Peter Shakerley
 1689–1693: Sir John Morgan, 2nd Baronet
 1693–1702: Roger Kirkby
 1702–1705: Peter Shakerley (again)
 1705–1713: Hugh Cholmondeley, 1st Earl of Cholmondeley
 1713–1714: Thomas Ashton
 1714–1725: Hugh Cholmondeley, 1st Earl of Cholmondeley (again)
 1725–1733: George Cholmondeley, 2nd Earl of Cholmondeley
 1725–1770: George Cholmondeley, 3rd Earl of Cholmondeley
 1770–1775: James Cholmondeley
 1775–1796: Charles Rainsford
 1796–1844: Edward Morrison

Lieutenant-governors
 1644: Sir Francis Gamell
 1705–    : Thomas Brooke
 1712–1713: Thomas Ashton
 1715–1730: William Newton
 1731–1770: James Cholmondeley
 1770–1779: David Home
 1779–1786: Thomas Fraser
 1786–1802: William Gunn
 1802–1817: William Grey
 1817–1828: Edmund Coghlan
 1828–1843: Sir John Fraser

References

Sources

Military history of Cheshire
Chester